

This is a list of the National Register of Historic Places listings in Marlboro County, South Carolina.

This is intended to be a complete list of the properties and districts on the National Register of Historic Places in Marlboro County, South Carolina, United States.  The locations of National Register properties and districts for which the latitude and longitude coordinates are included below, may be seen in a map.

There are 10 properties and districts listed on the National Register in the county.

Current listings

|}

See also

List of National Historic Landmarks in South Carolina
National Register of Historic Places listings in South Carolina

References

Marlboro County